The Year of the Solar System is a NASA education/public outreach initiative. The year runs October 2010 until August 2012, a Martian year. For each month's topic there are resources for clubs, schools and the general public. The months/topics are:
 October 2010: The Journey Begins
 November 2010: Birth of Worlds
 Dec 2010/Jan 2011: A Family Affair
 February 2011: Small Bodies—Big Impacts
 March 2011: Ancient Astronomers/Modern Tools: Celebrating Sun-Earth Day
 April 2011: Water, Water, Everywhere!
 May 2011: Volcanism!
 June 2011: Impacts!
 July 2011: Rocks in Space
 August 2011: Windy Worlds
 September 2011: Gravity: It's What Keeps Us Together
 October 2011: Moons and Rings: Our Favorite Things
 November 2011: Magnetospheres: Planetary Shields
 Dec 2011/Jan 2012: Evolving Worlds
 February 2012: Far-Ranging Robots
 March 2012: Shadows of the Sun
 April 2012: Ice!
 May 2012: New Data, New Ideas
 Jun/Jul 2012: Got Life?
 August 2012: Discovering New Worlds
The Year of the Solar System is supported by NASA's Science Mission Directorate and its Planetary Science Division.

References

Astronomy events
NASA programs